The Kia Carnival is a minivan manufactured by Kia since 1998. It is marketed globally under various nameplates — prominently as the Kia Sedona — which is now unused in favor of the Carnival.

The first generation Carnival was introduced in September 1998, and was marketed in a single, short wheelbase version. Second generation models were marketed (2006–2014) in short and long wheelbase variants. A rebadged variant of the second generation was offered in North America as the Hyundai Entourage (2007–2009). Beginning in 2010, the second generation model received updated equipment, including Kia's corporate Tiger Nose grille, as introduced by its then new design chief, Peter Schreyer. Kia introduced its third generation minivan in 2014, solely in a long wheelbase format. The fourth generation was introduced in 2020, when Kia also began using the Carnival nameplate worldwide.



First generation (KV-II; 1998) 

The first generation model was manufactured and marketed differently for specific regions, including under a joint venture in the Chinese market with Dongfeng Yueda Kia, as well as the Naza Ria in Malaysia.

In Indonesia and the Philippines, both Carnival/Sedona names were used. Initially introduced as the Carnival in 2001, from 2003 onwards, it was renamed as the Sedona.

Markets

Australia 
In Australia, the Kia Carnival went on sale in 1999, with a standard 5-speed manual and 2.5 L V6 producing 177 hp (132 kW). A 4-speed automatic was optional. In 2001, it outsold the Toyota Tarago, becoming the top-selling minivan in the country. It was a sales leader again in 2004 and 2005 when sales peaked at 5,259 units.

Europe 
In Europe, the first generation was available only with Rover's 2.5 L KV6 engine 24V petrol with 163 PS and Euro 2 standard emission level and the 2.9 L turbo-diesel engine with 126 PS. From 2001, Kia Motors introduced the 2.5 L KV6 Euro 3 with 150 PS and the 2.9 L CRDi common rail diesel engine with 144 PS.

North America 
In North America, the Sedona came equipped with a 3.5 L Hyundai V6 engine making 195 hp (145 kW) and a 4-speed automatic (later a 5-speed automatic transmission). The first generation Sedona lacked many features that other minivans offered, such as power sliding doors and power liftgate, fold flat third row seats, navigation system, rear-view camera, and backup sensors. Early Sedonas were rated at 15.6 L/100 km (15.1 mpg) (city) and 10.9 L/100 km (21.6 mpg) (highway), but the numbers improved slightly to 14.8 L/100 km (15.9 mpg) (city) and 9.6 L/100 km (24.5 mpg) (highway) for 2005 models.

In North America, the EX was the highest-level body style with amenities such as interior and exterior chrome accents, interior wood grain, leather wrapped steering wheel and gear shift knob and alloy wheels, with optional leather appointed seating, sunroof and DVD player.

Facelift 
The facelift model was first released in South Korea on 11 February 2001 as the Carnival II. In most markets, this model retained the Carnival name, while North American and some Asian markets renamed this model as the Sedona, which has been used in the United Kingdom since the pre-facelift model in September 1999. Left-hand drive models received a redesigned dashboard and door trim, while the right-hand drive models retained the previous dashboard and door trim design from the pre-facelift model.

Naza Ria

Second generation (VQ; 2005) 

Kia introduced the second generation Carnival/Sedona worldwide in 2005–in short (SWB) and long-wheelbase (LWB) models – with a 2-inch-wider front track, 3-inch-wider rear track and reduced turning radius than the first generation. The SWB model shares its platform with the Kia Magentis – and was specially designed for the European market, where it falls in the large MPV class.

With a lighter engine, greater use of high-tensile steel in the body, and a lighter transmission and rear suspension, the second generation model weighed approximately 400 lbs less than the first generation.

In certain markets, Kia offered the minivan in both wheelbases (e.g., in North America, Australia) or in other markets, simply as the short-wheelbase configuration (e.g., UK, France). Globally, the minivan was offered with four engines as well as manual and automatic transmissions.

Equipment content varied widely by market–including such features as six airbags (front, front side and air curtain), Anti-lock braking system (ABS) with Electronic Brakeforce Distribution (EBD), Electronic Stability Control (ESC) with Traction Control System (TCS) & Brake Assist System (BAS), dual or tri-zone heating and cooling, "walk through" aisle between the front seats with fold-down tray, tilt/height adjustable steering wheel, Isofix anchor points, rear side sliding doors with "hold open" locking feature (to prevent an open door from inadvertently closing), second row power roll-down windows, third row 60/40-fold-in-floor seat (LWB only), power sliding doors and liftgate, backup sensors, and in-dash navigation.

In European and Asian markets, the SWB models offered a full range of options and available equipment, with a 2+3+2 seating configuration (an essential format in a large MPV for Europe). By contrast, in North America the SWB model was offered only in a base equipment level, with the 2+3+2 seating configuration and high-end options exclusive to LWB models.

Markets

United States 
Kia introduced the second generation Sedona to the North American market at the Chicago Auto Show in February 2005 for the 2006 model year offering a single engine/transmission choice, the 240 hp 3.8-liter V6 Hyundai Lambda engine with continuously variable intake valve timing and a five-speed manumatic automatic transmission.

Initially offered only in long-wheelbase (LWB) form, the short-wheelbase (SWB) model followed for the 2007 model year. Trim levels include Sedona (SWB), Sedona LX (LWB) and Sedona EX (LWB). A rebadged version of the second generation was offered from 2007 to 2009 as the Hyundai Entourage.

The van was updated for the 2011 model year with a new Tiger Nose grille and taillights, a more powerful engine and a six-speed automatic transmission, but dropped the short-wheelbase version because of poor sales.

The North American configuration earned a five-star safety rating from the National Highway Traffic Safety Administration for all seating positions in frontal and side-impact crashes. The Insurance Institute for Highway Safety also rated the Sedona "Good" – its highest rating – in front, side and rear impacts. The IIHS has christened the 2006 Sedona a "Gold Top Safety Pick", making the Sedona (and the similar Hyundai Entourage) the safest minivan currently tested. Kia had announced that the 2012 Kia Sedona will be the last Sedona for the American market.

In May 2012, Kia said the Sedona would be discontinued in the U.S. market after the 2012 model year, with a company spokesperson saying the company did not expect to permanently leave the minivan market.

In 2013, Kia relaunched the Sedona as a 2014 model with minor updates.

United Kingdom 
The second generation Sedona was the second top selling large MPV in the UK market, and in 2010 received a new grille, new equipment (including a reversing camera built into the rear-view mirror) and a single engine choice, a 192 PS 2.2 CRDi inline-four replacing the 183 PS 2.9 CRDi. The second generation was marketed in three trim levels (1, 2 and 3) with a 5-speed manual transmission or six-speed automatic gearbox. Trim level 1 included air conditioning and electric windows. Trim level 2 received alloy wheels, rear parking camera with the display incorporated into the rear-view mirror, and climate control. Trim level 3 added electronic stability control, leather seats, heated front seats, power tailgate and powered folding door mirrors.

In September 2012, the Sedona was withdrawn from the UK market due to poor sales.

Australia 

The second generation Carnival went on sale in Australia in January 2006. Initially, the long-wheelbase 3.8L V6 5-speed automatic Grand Carnival was sold alongside the previous generation 2.5L V6 Carnival, until the second-generation SWB Carnival arrived in August of that year, available in both 5-speed manual and 4-speed automatic, and new 2.7L V6 engine. Both models sat 8 passengers. A 2.9L turbo diesel engine was introduced in the Grand Carnival in March 2009. In June 2010, the Carnival and Grand Carnival underwent a mild facelift, the manual transmission was dropped from the SWB model, and the LWB model received a new 3.5L V6 and 6-speed automatic. In 2011, the SWB Carnival was dropped entirely, while the LWB model gained the new 2.2L "R" series diesel engine, replacing the previous 2.9L engine. The Carnival was Australia's best-selling people mover between 2007 and 2013.

Reception 
The Kia Sedona (Carnival) has received the 2007 MotorWeek "Best Minivan" award in its 2007 Drivers' Choice Awards and The Car Books 2007 "Best Bet" distinction. Overall, Kia models improved 22% in J.D. Power and Associates 2006 Initial Quality Study (IQS), and improved twice as much as any competitor in the last 3 years.

The Kia Sedona ranked 4th the "20 least expensive 2009 vehicles to insure" list by Insure.com. Edmunds.com names Kia Sedona as one of the "Top Recommended" Vehicles for 2010.

 Reliability 
 In the 2007 reliability report published by TÜV, 1st generation (1999–2005) of Kia Carnival placed 113th out of 113 in the 2- to 3-year-old cars category, with a defect rate of 25.1%. In the 2008 TÜV report, 1st generation (1999–2005) of Kia Carnival placed 116th out of 116 in the same category, with a defect rate of 19.70%, and also placed 111th out of 111 in the 4- to 5-year-old cars category, with a defect rate of 27.60%.
 According to MSN autos reliability survey, 2006 Kia Sedona reliability rated as good, overall 5/5. It rated as "Minimal Problems", and comment as "Infrequent problems reported, all with low repair costs." MSN Autos use Identifix for data on all automobiles.
 According to MyRide.com reliability survey, The MyRide Reliability Ratings are collected from visitors and past customers of Autobytel Inc.'s websites (Autobytel.com, Autoweb.com and CarSmart.com) who own vehicles from model year 2001 and newer via an online survey conducted by an independent third party.
Durability scored 86 (Industrial average 80)
Mechanical Quality scored 89 (Industrial average 80)
 The 2009 Kia Sedona's JD Power reliability score is same as the 2009 Honda Odyssey and 2009 Dodge Grand Caravan.

 Hyundai Entourage 

From 2006 to 2009, Kia manufactured a rebadged variant of the Carnival for sister company Hyundai. Manufactured in Kia's Sohari Plant and marketed as the Hyundai Entourage''', the  production Entourage was shown at the Chicago Auto Show in February 2006 and went on sale in April 2006 in long wheelbase form.

The Entourage was powered by the company's 3.8 L Lambda V6, seated seven, and offered optional equipment including automatic climate control, leather seating, power sliding doors and tailgate, reverse sensors, and a six-disc in-dash CD changer.

In April 2009, the Entourage was discontinued in North America for the 2010 model year. Entourage's revised styling was adopted in South Korea as a facelift for the Kia Carnival, except for revised grilles suited to the Kia brand.

 Trim levels 
 The (base) GLS model features 16-inch wheels, removable second-row captain's chairs, 60/40 split-folding third-row fold-in-floor seat, a six-way manual-adjustable driver seat, tri-zone air-conditioning, six-speaker CD stereo, cruise control, power windows and door locks and keyless entry.
 The SE level adds 17-inch alloys, dual power-sliding rear doors, heated mirrors, automatic climate control, a leather-wrapped steering wheel with audio controls wood or metal accents and an eight-way power-adjustable driver seat.
 The Limited trim level includes a power opening/closing liftgate, heated leather seats and an electroluminescent instrument cluster – with optional sunroof, 13-speaker surround-sound audio system, four-way power front-passenger seat, power-adjustable pedals and seating memory system.

 Awards 
The American configuration of the Hyundai Entourage earned a five-star safety rating–the highest honor the National Highway Traffic Safety Administration bestows–for all seating positions in frontal and side-impact crashes. The Insurance Institute for Highway Safety (IIHS) rates the Entourage "Good"–its highest rating – in front, side and rear impacts. The IIHS rated the 2007 Entourage a "Gold Top Safety Pick," making Entourage with the similar Kia Sedona the safest minivans tested for 2007.

The 2009 Hyundai Entourage minivan was recognized as a Best Family Car for 2009 by Parents magazine and Edmunds.com in their annual list of family vehicles.

The Hyundai Entourage ranked 3rd for the "20 least expensive 2009 vehicles to insure" list by Insure.com. According to research, the Entourage is one of the least expensive vehicle to insure. Low rates tend to reflect a vehicle's safety, and the drivers who tend to buy them.

  Third generation (YP; 2014) 

The third generation Carnival/Sedona debuted in April 2014 at the New York International Auto Show for the 2015 model year.

 Markets 

United States
In the United States, the Sedona was previously only available in LX and EX trim levels. In 2015, Kia expanded the trim levels to L, LX, EX, SX and Limited.

Saudi Arabia
In Saudi Arabia, it is available in the Grand Carnival version and comes in the LX and EX trim levels, whereby EX being the top-of-the-line with some SX-L features.

 Australia 
In Australia, the Carnival is available in S, Si, SLi and Platinum trim levels with the choice of either the Lambda 3.3-litre GDI V6 or the R-Series 2.2-litre I4 Diesel mated to a 6-speed automatic, while models from 2018 came standard with an 8-speed automatic. Since its Australian debut in February 2015, the Carnival has consistently been Australia's top selling people mover averaging around 500 sales per month, while for the year of 2019, 6,493 Carnival's had been registered.

India
Kia India launched the Carnival in India on 5 February 2020 at the Auto Expo 2020. The Indian version is powered by a 2.2-litre CRDi diesel engine, mated to an eight speed automatic transmission. The Carnival is available in three variants, which are Prestige, Limousine and Limousine+.

 Indonesia 
In Indonesia, the Grand Sedona was launched in August 2016 at the 24th Gaikindo Indonesia International Auto Show in gasoline variant. The diesel variant and facelifted version of the Grand Sedona was launched at the 26th Gaikindo Indonesia International Auto Show in August 2018.

 Malaysia 
The third generation Carnival was launched in Malaysia in March 2017 as the Grand Carnival as a fully imported vehicle. In January 2018, the vehicle became locally assembled in Malaysia. The Malaysian market Grand Carnival is powered by the 2.2 litre diesel engine with a six-speed automatic transmission. Kia launched the eight-speed automatic transmission in October 2018.

 Vietnam 
In Vietnam, the Grand Sedona is manufactured in joint venture with THACO at the Chu Lai plant in Quang Nam Province. This model is exported to Thailand since 2019.

 Pakistan 
As of 1 June 2018, Kia has launched the Grand Carnival in Pakistan in collaboration with its local partner Yunus Brothers Group forming Kia Lucky Motors Pakistan.

 Thailand 
In Thailand, Yontrakit Kia Motor Co. Ltd has launched the Kia Grand Carnival in Thailand. In November 2019, Yontrakit Kia started importing the Carnival LX trim level from Vietnam instead of South Korea, resulting in significant price reduction due to the ASEAN free trade area.

 Mexico 
The facelifted Sedona was introduced in Mexico on 5 September 2018 as a 2019 model. It is offered in four trim lines; LX, EX, EX Pack and SXL trim levels. All versions feature a 3.3-litre engine.

  Fourth generation (KA4; 2020) 

The fourth generation Carnival debuted in June 2020. Sales in South Korea began in September 2020.

 Markets 

North America
The Sedona nameplate was introduced in the United States in 2001, and used until the fourth generation, when the Kia began using the Carnival nameplate globally. It made its virtual US market debut for the 2022 model year on February 23, 2021. In the US market, the 2022 Carnival is only offered with the 290 hp Smartstream G3.5'' GDi V6. The car went on sale in the U.S. and Canada starting May 2021. For the North American market, the assembly is imported from South Korea.

China 
The fourth-generation Carnival was introduced in China in September 2020 as an imported model. It is equipped with the 3.5-litre GDi petrol engine. It is locally assembled since September 2021 by using imported knock-down kits. The locally assembled Carnival is equipped with the locally-built 2.0-litre T-GDi petrol engine.

Indonesia
The fourth-generation Carnival was introduced in Indonesia on November 11, 2021, at the 28th Gaikindo Indonesia International Auto Show. It is available with two grades, Dynamic and Premiere with 11-seater configuration and only available with the 2.2-litre diesel engine. The 7 seater called "Premiere" followed later in 2022.

Russia 
In March 2021, the fourth-generation Carnival went on sale in Russia and other CIS markets. It is assembled in Kaliningrad by Avtotor and available in 7-seater and 8-seater configurations.

Thailand
In November 2020, the fourth-generation Carnival was launched in Thailand. It is available with three grades and all come with 11 seats as standard. The updated Carnival was introduced in Thailand in September 2021. Three grade levels are on offer (Limited, EX and SXL) and all get 11-seats and the Smartstream R 2.2-litre turbo-diesel engine as standard.

Vietnam
The 4th generation Kia Carnival for Vietnam was unveiled on October 9, 2021, it comes with 2 engine options included Smartstream D2.2 CRDi turbo-charged diesel engine and Smartstream G3.5 MPI naturally-aspirated petrol engine. The Carnival is assembled by THACO for the Vietnamese market with 5 grade levels.

Malaysia

In late 2021, the Malaysian-market fourth-generation Carnival made its local debut and went on sale as a CBU model in the 11-seater configuration while the CKD model went on sale in late July 2022. The CKD model is sold alongside the CBU model and available in 7 or 8-seater configuration. The 8-seater configuration comes in 2 grades, Mid and High while the 7-seater is only available in the High variant. Regardless of model and variants, it is only available with the 2.2D Smartstream engine paired with 8-speed automatic transmission. The Carnival is manufactured at the new Kia Motor Manufacturing Malaysia (KMMM) assembly plant located in Kulim, Kedah, which will serve both domestic and export markets.

Philippines
The fourth-generation Carnival was launched in the Philippines in February 2022. It is offered in 2 grades; base EX and the top-spec SX, both with the 2.2-litre diesel engine.

Powertrain

Sales

References

External links 

 

Carnival
Cars introduced in 1998
Euro NCAP large MPVs
Front-wheel-drive vehicles
Minivans
2000s cars
2010s cars